Francisco Cerúndolo was the defending champion but chose not to defend his title.

Zhang Zhizhen won the title after defeating Andrea Vavassori 2–6, 7–6(7–5), 6–3 in the final.

Seeds

Draw

Finals

Top half

Bottom half

References

External links
Main draw
Qualifying draw

Internazionali di Tennis del Friuli Venezia Giulia - 1
2022 Men's singles